Sheikha Shamsa bint Suhail Al Mazrouei is the widow of Sheikh Khalifa bin Zayed Al Nahyan, President of the United Arab Emirates.

Family
She is the mother of:

 Sheikh Sultan
 Sheikh Mohammed
 Sheikha Sheikha
 Sheikha Mouza
 Sheikha Osha
 Sheikha Salama
 Sheikha Shamma
 Sheikha Latifa

References

Spouses of presidents of the United Arab Emirates
Shamsa
People from Abu Dhabi
Year of birth missing (living people)
Living people